"Wow" (stylized in all caps) is a song by Swedish singer Zara Larsson, originally released as a promotional single on 26 April 2019 through TEN Music Group and Epic Records. It was co-written and produced by Marshmello. The song was featured in the 2020 Netflix movie Work It and was announced by Larsson to be released as a single on 26 August 2020. It serves as the second single from Larsson's third studio album Poster Girl. A remix of the song featuring Sabrina Carpenter was released on 25 September 2020.

Background
The song was first used in an advertisement for Citibank in the United States. It was then registered on music recognition app Shazam, and on 10 April 2019, the official verified Genius account of Larsson's label TEN Music Group added the song's release date as 26 April 2019, which makes it a month after the release of Larsson's single "Don't Worry Bout Me".

Composition
The song is written in the key of F-sharp minor with a tempo of 155 beats per minute.

Critical reception
Mike Wass of Idolator characterised the song as about "feeling sexy in your own skin", calling it an "exciting addition to Zara’s discography" and complimenting its "magnificent post-chorus drop".

Sabrina Carpenter remix

A remix of the song featuring Work It's lead actress Sabrina Carpenter was released on 25 September 2020. Its music video premiered on 7 October.

Charts

Certifications

References

2020 singles
2019 songs
Zara Larsson songs
Songs written by Marshmello
Songs written by Madison Love